Alessandro Bianchi (born 12 February 1965 in Oliena) is an Italian politician.

He graduated at the University of Cagliari and works as an oncologist in Nuoro. Bianchi is a member of the Democratic Party and served as Mayor of Nuoro from June 2010 to June 2015. He ran for a second term at the 2015 elections, but lost to independent candidate Andrea Soddu.

See also
2010 Italian local elections
List of mayors of Nuoro

References

External links
 

1965 births
Living people
Mayors of Nuoro
People from Nuoro
Democratic Party (Italy) politicians
Democrats of the Left politicians